The  is a subcompact car produced by Japanese automaker Daihatsu since 2004, and also sold under Toyota brand as the . The Passo was once sold at Toyota Corolla Store Japanese dealerships until it was consolidated with other Toyota dealers in 2020.

Outside Japan, the first- and second-generation Boon is sold as the second- and third-generation Sirion. The first-generation Sirion was sold as the Storia in Japan.

According to Daihatsu, the name "Boon" is derived from the English word boon, and also inspired by the sound that Japanese children make when imitating the sound of a car, while the name "Passo" is Italian for "step". According to Toyota, the name conjures up the image of a casual and approachable car.



First generation (M300/AC10; 2004) 

The development for the first-generation Boon was led by Toyota chief engineer Tetsuya Tada. For the Japanese domestic market, the Boon were available with 996 cc and 1.3-litre engines. The major difference between the Japanese Boon and Sirion are automatic version where the gear-changing located beside the steering on the dashboard and the handbrake below the steering. Both the Japanese Boon and European Sirion were offered in both front-wheel drive and four-wheel drive versions. A 936 cc turbocharged version with four-wheel drive was also available, known as the Boon X4.

The Boon was designed for European tastes and the model took on a larger and stockier frame.

In early 2005, Daihatsu launched the Japanese-built 2nd generation Sirion in Brunei using the facility and parts from the Boon. The model was discontinued along with the Daihatsu brand exited the Brunei market as the passenger cars market (except the commercial vehicles) and is replaced by the Perodua-badged Myvi, which is launched in the country in April 2016 and onward.

On 25 May 2005, Malaysian automaker Perodua launched a variant of the Boon known as the Perodua Myvi. Sporting a few cosmetic differences, the Myvi became Perodua's best-selling car in Malaysia for 2006, 2007, 2008 and 2009.

On 25 December 2006, the Boon was restyled. This version was exported to Europe as the Sirion in 2007.

In 2007, Daihatsu launched the Sirion in Indonesia using the facility and parts from the Myvi.

The Subaru Justy was unveiled at the 2007 Frankfurt Motor Show using the Boon model. It is positioned as an entry-level model in Subaru's lineup.

In April 2013, Toyota New Zealand announced its decision to stop selling the second-generation Sirion, still on sale, stating it was unable to secure Daihatsu products that comply with future regulatory standards for New Zealand.

The second-generation Sirion was discontinued in South Africa in April 2015, when Daihatsu left the South African market.

Boon/Sirion

Passo

Justy

Boon Luminas (M500; 2008) 

"Sette" means "seven" in Italian, referring to the car's 7-seater capability. The Boon Luminas and Passo Sette were discontinued in early 2012 due to poor sales. The Malaysian variant was launched in the country as the Perodua Alza on 23 November 2009, and fared much better there.

Boon Luminas

Passo Sette

Second generation (M600/AC30; 2010) 

The second-generation Boon was unveiled in Japan on 15 February 2010 alongside the second-generation Passo.

The second-generation Myvi, based on the Boon, was released in Malaysia on 17 June 2011.

The third-generation Sirion for the Indonesian market was unveiled at the 19th Indonesia International Motor Show on 23 July 2011.

Boon

Passo

Third generation (M700; 2016) 

The third-generation Boon and Passo were unveiled in Japan on 12 April 2016. Both received the first update on 10 October 2018, along with the introduction of "Style" variant for the Boon. The Passo has an improved collision avoidance support system (Smart Assist III) which can grasp various information such as pedestrians, vehicles, preceding and oncoming vehicles, and obstacles and then activate various driver assistance systems such as alerting the driver or switching between low and high beams.

The third-generation Boon is the only model that does not share any mechanical/visual components with the third-generation Myvi/fourth-generation Sirion.

Boon

Passo

References

External links 

  (Boon)
  (Passo)

Boon
Cars introduced in 2004
2010s cars
2020s cars
Subcompact cars
Hatchbacks
Front-wheel-drive vehicles
All-wheel-drive vehicles
Vehicles with CVT transmission